

Results
The 2000 Democratic Primary in Connecticut was held on March 7, 2000. The two candidates competing for the votes and 67 delegates in Connecticut were Al Gore and Bill Bradley. Al Gore won the Connecticut primary with 55.60% of the votes in Connecticut.

References

Notes 

Connecticut Democratic primaries